Maria Goia (1878–1924) was an Italian politician, feminist, and trade unionist.

Italian feminists
Italian socialist feminists
1878 births
1924 deaths